The 1959 Auckland City mayoral election was part of the New Zealand local elections held that same year. In 1959, elections were held for the Mayor of Auckland plus other local government positions including twenty-one city councillors. The polling was conducted using the standard first-past-the-post electoral method.

Background
High profile councillor Dove-Myer Robinson defeated incumbent Mayor Keith Buttle of the Citizens & Ratepayers ticket, who had not been opposed by Robinson and his United Independent colleagues in the 1957 contest. Campaigning as "Robbie", Robinson campaigned on an independent and populist platform. He charged Buttle with lethargy and the Citizens & Ratepayers councillors as being out of touch with Aucklanders and taking power for granted. Media coverage (both the Auckland Star and New Zealand Herald openly endorsing Buttle) cemented Robinson's image as an outsider battling the politics of vested interest, hallmarks that would define Robinson's style of campaigning and leadership for the rest of his life. The United Independents electoral ticket had merged with the Labour Party to campaign together under the Civic Reform banner and informally supported Robinson for the mayoralty.

Mayoralty results

Councillor results

Notes

References

Mayoral elections in Auckland
1959 elections in New Zealand
Politics of the Auckland Region
1950s in Auckland
November 1959 events in New Zealand